Monty Works the Wires is a 1921 British silent comedy film directed by Manning Haynes and Challis Sanderson and starring Haynes, Mildred Evelyn and Eva Westlake.

Cast
 H. Manning Haynes as The Man  
 Mildred Evelyn as The Girl  
 Eva Westlake as The Auntie  
 Charles Ashton as The Brother-in-Law  
 Gladys Hamer as The Maid  
 Thomas Canning as The Doctor

References

Bibliography
 Murphy, Robert. Directors in British and Irish Cinema: A Reference Companion. British Film Institute, 2006.

External links

1921 films
1921 comedy films
British silent feature films
British comedy films
Films directed by H. Manning Haynes
British black-and-white films
1920s English-language films
1920s British films
Silent comedy films